Gordon Korman (born October 23, 1963) is a Canadian American author of children's and young adult fiction books. Korman's books have sold more than 30 million copies worldwide over a career spanning four decades and have appeared at number one on The New York Times Best Seller list.

Early life
Korman was born in Montreal, Quebec, where he lived until 1970. He grew up in Thornhill, Ontario (just north of Toronto) and attended German Mills Public School and public high school at Thornlea Secondary School. 

He moved to the United States to attend college at New York University where he studied film and film-writing. Korman received a BFA from New York University in 1985; with a degree in dramatic visual writing and a minor in motion picture and television.

Career

Korman wrote his first book when he was 12 years old, as part of an English class taught by a PE teacher in 7th grade. This became the manuscript for This Can't Be Happening at Macdonald Hall, the first book in his Macdonald Hall series. Korman was the Scholastic Arrow Book Club monitor for the class; after completing the assignment, he mailed his manuscript to Scholastic. This Can't Be Happening at Macdonald Hall was published by Scholastic Press in 1978 when Korman was only 14 years old. Before graduating from high school in Thornhill, Ontario, Korman wrote and published five books.

Korman has written 100 books which have sold more than 35 million copies in a career that has spanned four decades.

Works

Standalone books

I Want to Go Home! (1981) 
Our Man Weston (1982)
No Coins, Please (1984)
Don't Care High (1985)
Son of Interflux (1986)
A Semester in the Life of a Garbage Bag (1987)
Radio 5th Grade (1989)
Losing Joe's Place (1990)
The Twinkie Squad (1992)
The Toilet Paper Tigers (1993)
Why Did the Underwear Cross the Road (1994)
 The Chicken Doesn't Skate (1996)
Liar, Liar Pants on Fire (1997)
The Sixth Grade Nickname Game (1998)

No More Dead Dogs (2000)
Maxx Comedy: The Funniest Kid in America (2003)
Jake, Reinvented (2003)
Born To Rock (2006)
Schooled (2007)
The Juvie Three (2008)
Pop (2009)
Slacker (2016)
Restart (2017)
What's His Face? (2018)
The Unteachables (2019)
Level 13: A Slacker novel (2019)
Notorious (2019)
War Stories (2020)
Unplugged (2021)
Linked (2021)
Operation Do-Over (2022)
The Fort (2022)
The Superteacher Project (2023)

Series

Macdonald Hall series

This Can't Be Happening at Macdonald Hall (Scholastic-TAB Publications, 1978)
Go Jump in the Pool (1979)
Beware the Fish! (1980)
The War With Mr. Wizzle (1982)
The Zucchini Warriors (1988)
Macdonald Hall Goes Hollywood (1991)
Something Fishy at Macdonald Hall (1995)

Bugs Potter
Who is Bugs Potter? (1980)
Bugs Potter LIVE at Nickaninny (1983)

Jeremy Bloom
The D− Poems of Jeremy Bloom: A Collection of Poems About School, Homework, and Life (Sort Of) (1992)
The Last-Place Sports Poems of Jeremy Bloom: A Collection of Poems About Winning, Losing, and Being a Good Sport (Sometimes) (1996)

Masterminds series
 Masterminds (2015)
 Masterminds:Criminal Destiny (2016)
 Masterminds:Payback (2017)

Slapshots series
The Stars From Mars (1999)
All-Mars All-Stars/The Dream Team (1999)
The Face-off Phony (2000)
Cup Crazy (2000)
4-in-1 Slapshots: The Complete Collection (2008)

Nose Pickers series
Nose Pickers from Outer Space! (1999)
Planet of the Nose Pickers (2000)
Your Mummy Is a Nose Picker (2000)
Invasion of the Nose Pickers  (2001)
4-in-1 The Ultimate Nose-Picker Collection (2006)

Island series

Shipwreck (2001)
Survival (2001)
Escape (2001)
3-in-1 Island Trilogy Bind-Up Book (2006)

Son of the Mob
 Son of the Mob (Hyperion, 2002)
 Son of the Mob 2: Hollywood Hustle (2004)

Everest series
 The Contest
 The Climb 
 The Summit

Dive series
The Discovery (2003)
The Deep (2003)
The Danger (2003)

On the Run series
Chasing the Falconers (2005)
The Fugitive Factor (2005)
Now You See Them, Now You Don't (2005)
The Stowaway Solution (2005)
Public Enemies (2005)
Hunting the Hunter (2006)

Kidnapped series
The Abduction (2006)
The Search (2006)
The Rescue (2006)

Swindle series
Swindle (2008)
Zoobreak (2009)
Framed (2010)
Showoff (2012)
Hideout (2013)
Jackpot (2014)
Unleashed (2015)
Jingle (2016)

Titanic series
Unsinkable (2011)
Collision Course (2011)
S.O.S  (2011)

The 39 Clues

(Series shared and all books written by different authors)
One False Note (2008)
The Emperor's Code (2010)
Vespers Rising (2011)
The Medusa Plot (2011)
Flashpoint (2014)

Hypnotists series
 The Hypnotists (2013)
 Memory Maze (2014)
 The Dragonfly Effect (2015)

Ungifted series
 Ungifted (2012)
 Supergifted (2018)

Adaptations
The Monday Night Football Club series was adapted as the Disney Channel TV series The Jersey, which ran for four years between 1999 and 2004.

Swindle was adapted into a movie that aired on Nickelodeon in  2013.

The Macdonald Hall series has a TV adaptation of one of the books, called "Bruno and Boots Go Jump in the Pool". It stars Jonny Gray, Callan Potter and Peter Keleghan. It aired April 1, 2016 on the Canadian network YTV. Two more adaptations aired there the following year, April 1, 2017.

Other optioned books include No Coins, Please, I Want to Go Home, the Island trilogy and The Twinkie Squad.

Awards and recognition
 Air Canada Award for promising authors in Canada, at age 17
 1991 Manitoba Young Reader's Choice Award (chosen by Manitoba schoolchildren), The Zucchini Warriors (1988)
 1999 ALA Popular Paperbacks for Young Adults, The Toilet Paper Tigers (1993)
 2001 American Library Association Popular Paperbacks for Young Adults, Losing Joe's Place (1990)
 2001 ALA Popular Paperbacks for Young Adults, The Chicken Doesn't Skate (1993)
 2003 ALA Top Ten Best Books for Young Adults, Son of the Mob (2002)
 2003 Pacific Northwest Library Association Young Reader's Choice Award (chosen by Pacific NW schoolchildren), Intermediate Division (Grades 7–9), No More Dead Dogs (2003)
 2004 ALA Best Books for Young Adults, Jake Reinvented (2003)
 2005 PNLA Young Reader's Choice Award – Intermediate, Son of the Mob (2002)
 2010 PNLA Young Reader's Choice Award – Intermediate, Schooled (2007)
 2010–2011 Charlie May Simon Children's Book Award (by vote of Arkansas schoolchildren), Swindle (2008)
2011–2012 Charlie May Simon Award, Zoobreak (2009)
2016 Anne V. Zarrow Award for Young Readers' Literature
2020 Young Hoosier Book Award (Intermediate), Restart (2017)

See also

References

External links

 
 

 

1963 births
Living people
Canadian children's writers
Child writers
People from Côte Saint-Luc
People from Thornhill, Ontario
New York University alumni
Canadian emigrants to the United States